The northern buffed-cheeked gibbon (Nomascus annamensis) is a newly discovered species of crested gibbon which is found in Vietnam, Cambodia, and Laos. Its habitat is in the humid subtropical and seasonal tropical forests of these countries.

Description
The northern buffed-cheeked gibbon resembles Nomascus gabriellae in appearance.  Males and females of N. annamensis differ in morphology and color.  The male has a primarily black pelt that glistens silver in sunlight, with a lighter brown chest. The cheeks are a deep golden-orange, and the crest is very prominent. The female, though, lacks the characteristic crest and is orange-beige in color.

The holotype is located in the Zoological Museum of the Vietnam National University.

References

External links

northern buffed-cheeked gibbon
Primates of Southeast Asia
Mammals of Cambodia
Mammals of Laos
Mammals of Vietnam
northern buffed-cheeked gibbon